This article refers to the health care company Primaris. See also Primaris Airlines and Primaris REIT.

Primaris is a health care consulting company in Columbia, Missouri. Primaris has held the Medicare Quality Improvement Organizations contract for Missouri since the program was created.

The firm offers several type of consulting services related to quality reporting and improvement for health care providers in addition to its Medicare-funded QIO services.
 
Primaris also provides insurance counseling services for Missourians on Medicare as well as for Missourians wishing to enroll in the Health Insurance Marketplace.

History 
Primaris was founded in 1983 by the Missouri State Medical Association, Missouri Hospital Association and Missouri Association of Osteopathic Physicians and Surgeons. The company was originally named the Missouri Patient Care Review Foundation. The company later changed its name to the Missouri Patient Review Organization or MissouriPRO to reflect name changes in its federal contract with CMS. After the CMS contract changed names again, the nonprofit switched its name to Primaris. This generic name was selected intentionally to avoid a need for future changes should the federal contract be renamed.

At the time of Primaris' founding, its primary function was to provide third-party, non-biased review of complaints about medical care provided to Medicare beneficiaries. This is primarily accomplished through reviews of medical records. This role was federally mandated by Congress through what was then known as the Medicare Utilization and Quality Control Peer Review Program. Since that time, the program evolved several times, eventually becoming the Quality Improvement Organization (QIO) program. Under the current program, Primaris continues to provide medical record reviews; however, it plays a larger role working with hospitals, home health agencies, nursing homes and physicians on a variety of projects to improve CMS-specified quality measures.

Primaris Holdings, Inc. closed in December 2021 after filing for bankruptcy. The former Primaris Foundation, which holds the registered legal name Knowledge Management Associates, continues as an independent nonprofit, doing business as Missouri Connections for Health (MCH). MCH continues to operate the CLAIM program and other programs related to helping consumers get, keep, and use health insurance.

Some elements of the former Primaris group of affiliates also persist, including the Center for Patient Safety.

CLAIM Program 
From 1993 until early 2020, Primaris has run the CLAIM program through a contract with the Missouri Department of Insurance, Financial Institutions and Professional Registration/Missouri Department of Commerce and Insurance. The Centers for Medicare & Medicaid Services provided funding for the program until the program was moved to the Administration for Community Living (ACL). Beginning in 2020, the CLAIM program and its operating entity (Knowledge Management Associates d/b/a Primaris Foundation) separated from Primaris Holdings, Inc. Knowledge Management Associates registered as "Missouri Connections for Health" in 2020. The same key staff operate the CLAIM program as did so under the Primaris Umbrella. 

CLAIM is Missouri's State Health Insurance Assistance Program (SHIP). Every U.S. state or territory has a SHIP program, though most are run directly by state agencies. Primaris acquired the CLAIM program due to a hiring freeze affecting Missouri state agencies when the program was created. The freeze prevented state agencies from hiring staff to run the program, and so Primaris was contracted for the work.

CLAIM provides assistance navigating the Medicare system to Missourians. CLAIM was originally an acronym for "Community Leaders Assisting the Insured of Missouri," however, this has largely been dropped in favor of the shorter, easier-to-remember, name CLAIM.

Primaris provides this service through a network of more than 170 partner organizations and more than 250 volunteers trained by the program staff using CMS material. Missourians with Medicare questions can call the CLAIM helpline or send an electronic request on the CLAIM website. This gets referred to a local volunteer, if available, or a staff member, who answers questions or provides in-depth assistance.

Health care companies based in Missouri
Quality Improvement Organizations in Medicare